Stranger than Fiction may refer to:

Film 
 Stranger than Fiction (1921 film), a film starring Katherine MacDonald
 Stranger than Fiction (1930 film), a film featuring George Foley
 Stranger than Fiction (1934 film), a newsreel directed by Charles E. Ford
 Stranger than Fiction (1994 film), a documentary directed by Nicholas Briggs
 Stranger than Fiction (2000 film), an American comedy-thriller directed by Eric Bross
 Stranger than Fiction (2006 film), an American fantasy comedy-drama directed by Marc Forster

Literature 
 Stranger than Fiction: True Stories, a 2004 book by Chuck Palahniuk
 Stranger than Fiction, a 1959 book by Dennis Wheatley

Music 
 Stranger than Fiction, an American band that included Elliott Smith

Albums
 Stranger than Fiction (Bad Religion album) or the title song (see below), 1994
 Stranger than Fiction (John Surman Quartet album), 1994
 Stranger than Fiction (Keith LeBlanc album), 1989
 Stranger than Fiction (Ultra Nate album), 2000
 Stranger than Fiction (compilation album), featuring members of the Rock Bottom Remainders, 1998
 Stranger than Fiction (mixtape), by Kevin Gates, 2013
 Stranger than Fiction (soundtrack), from the 2006 film
 Stranger than Fiction, a demo by Sabbat, 1987

Songs
 "Stranger than Fiction" (Bad Religion song), 1994
 "Stranger than Fiction" (Five Finger Death Punch song), 2008
 "Stranger than Fiction" (Joe Jackson song), 1991
 "Stranger than Fiction", by Katharine McPhee from Hysteria
 "Stranger than Fiction", by moe. from Tin Cans & Car Tires
 "Stranger than Fiction", by Split Enz from Mental Notes

See also
Truth Stranger Than Fiction, a 1915 drama film